The Asian Federation Against Involuntary Disappearances (AFAD) is an international human rights organization which focuses on the issue of forced disappearance in Asia. AFAD was founded on 4 June 1998 in Manila, Philippines. The federation was awarded the Asia Democracy and Human Rights Award in 2016.

Members 
According to the 2018 Annual report of AFAD, 13 organizations and one individual member are part of the federation.

 Advocacy Forum (Nepal)
 Association of Parents of Disappeared Persons (Jammu and Kashmir, India)
 Citizens' Alliance for North Korean Human Rights (South Korea)
 Commission for Missing Persons and Victims of Violence (Indonesia)
 Conflict Victims' Society for Justice (Nepal)
 Defence of Human Rights (Pakistan)
 Families of the Disappeared (Sri Lanka)
 Families of Victims of Involuntary Disappearance (Philippines)
 Free Jonas Burgos Movement (Philippines)
 Association of Families of the Disappeared (Indonesia)
 Justice for Peace Foundation (Thailand)
 Odhikar (Bangladesh)
 Relatives Committee of the May 1992 Heroes (Thailand)
 Ng Shui Meng - Individual member from Laos

References

External links
 AFAD official website

Human rights organizations based in the Philippines
Human rights in Asia
Enforced disappearances